Edwin Howard Simmons (August 25, 1921 – May 5, 2007) was a United States Marine Corps brigadier general. He was a career officer who served in combat during three wars — including landing at Inchon and fighting at the Chosin Reservoir in the Korean War. He was renowned as the official Marine Corps historian, being called "the collective memory of the Marine Corps".  His 1974 book The United States Marines: A History is a seminal reference text.

Biography
Edwin Howard Simmons was born on August 25, 1921, in Paulsboro, New Jersey, and graduated from Paulsboro High School in 1938. He earned a bachelor of arts in journalism in 1942 at Lehigh University, where he had been elected to Phi Beta Kappa the previous year, and a master's degree in journalism in 1955 at Ohio State University. Prior to accepting his commission as a Marine Corps second lieutenant on June 12, 1942, he held an Army Reserve commission.

During World War II, he trained at Marine Corps Schools, Marine Corps Base Quantico, and Camp Lejeune, N.C., prior to serving overseas with the 5th Field Depot in the South and Central Pacific. He took part in combat during the capture of Guam and later served with the 7th Service Regiment on Okinawa and in China. He was promoted to captain in January 1944 and to major in June 1949.

Following the war, he served for three and one-half years as Managing Editor of the Marine Corps Gazette, then completed the Amphibious Warfare School, Junior Course, Quantico, in 1950.

At the outbreak of the Korean War, he commanded the Weapons Company, 1st Battalion, 6th Marines, Camp Lejeune. The half strength battalion was just back from the Mediterranean when it boarded a troop train west.  It was redesignated 3rd Battalion, 1st Marines. They were ordered to South Korea in August 1950 and participated in the Inchon Landing that September. He continued in combat as weapons company commander during the initial phases of the war; and as a battalion operations officer and executive officer during the Chinese Spring Offensive.

Returning to the United States in July 1951, he served in various assignments with the Training and Replacement Command at Camp Pendleton, California; with the Naval ROTC unit at Ohio State University; and with the G-4 Division at Headquarters Marine Corps. He was promoted to lieutenant colonel in December 1954. From August 1959 until October 1960, he served as Naval Attaché to the Dominican Republic. Carbine rifles from his office, left behind after the United States interrupted formal diplomatic relations, were used in the assassination of Trujillo according to the Church Committee. However, Simmons denied he played any direct role in the assassination. Prior to returning to the Dominican Republic in September 1961 as U.S. Military Liaison Officer, U.S. Embassy, Santo Domingo, he was assigned as senior editor, Publications Group, Marine Corps Schools, Quantico. In January 1962, he joined the Strategic Plans Section, G-3 Division at Headquarters Marine Corps, and in July 1963 was promoted to colonel.

From July 1965 until July 1966, he served in South Vietnam, first as G-3 of III Marine Amphibious Force (III MAF), and later, as commanding officer, 9th Marine Regiment, the "Striking Ninth".

Returning from Vietnam, he was a student at the National War College for the next year prior to reporting to Headquarters Marine Corps where he served as Deputy Fiscal Director of the Marine Corps from August 1967 until May 1970. He was advanced to the rank of brigadier general on June 1, 1968.

Brigadier General Simmons returned to Vietnam for another one-year tour, and served as Assistant Division Commander, 1st Marine Division (Rein),  "The Old Breed", and subsequently as deputy commander, III MAF.

He returned to Headquarters Marine Corps on  July 20, 1971, where he became special assistant to the chief of staff for strategic studies.

On December 1, 1971, he assumed duties as director of Marine Corps History and Museums. He went on the retired list on July 1, 1972, but continued on active duty without interruption of service as director of Marine Corps History and Museums.

On July 1, 1978, he reverted to inactive status on the retired list. In late October 1978, he returned as a Civil Service employee to his previous position as director of Marine Corps History and Museums.

Brigadier General Simmons died on May 5, 2007, at his home in Alexandria, Virginia.  He is survived by his wife, the former Frances G. Bliss of Denver, Colorado, two sons, Edwin H. Jr., and Clarke V., and two daughters, Bliss and Courtney.

Memberships
He was a fellow, governor, and treasurer of the Company of Military Historians and a member of the boards of trustees of the American Military Institute, the Marine Corps War Memorial Foundation, and the United States Commission on Military History. He also served as president of the 1st Marine Division Association, president of the American Society of Military Comptrollers, and vice-president of the National War College Alumni Association. In 1970, he received a Centennial Distinguished Graduate Medallion from Ohio State University.

Publications
Simmons wrote for numerous military and general publications, including the Naval Review, Naval Institute Proceedings, Marine Corps Gazette, Sea Power, and Army. He was the author of the history, 'The United States Marines (published in London, 1974;  and New York, 1976) and contributed extensively to various histories and standard works including the Encyclopædia Britannica and the Dictionary of American History.

His novel, Dog Company Six, received the W.Y. Boyd Literary Award for Excellence in Military Fiction from the American Library Association in 2001, and the Samuel Eliot Morison Award for Naval Literature in 2000.

Honors
In May 2013, construction began for the Senator John W. Warner Center for Advanced Military Studies at Marine Corps University in Quantico, Virginia.  A portion of this facility will house the Brigadier General Edwin H. Simmons Center for Marine Corps History.  The Simmons Center will consolidate resources from the Marine Corps History Division and the Archives and Special Collections Branch, currently held in three locations, into one facility.

Military awards
Simmons's military decorations and awards include:

Selected works by Edwin H. Simmons

 A novel about the Korean War.

 History of Marines at the Battle of Soissons during World War I.

See also

History of the United States Marine Corps
National Museum of the Marine Corps

Notes

References

1921 births
2007 deaths
Lehigh University alumni
United States Marine Corps personnel of World War II
United States Marine Corps personnel of the Korean War
United States Marine Corps personnel of the Vietnam War
American military historians
Recipients of the Navy Distinguished Service Medal
Recipients of the Silver Star
Recipients of the Legion of Merit
Recipients of the Gallantry Cross (Vietnam)
United States Marine Corps generals
5 Simmons, Edwin H.
United States naval attachés
American male non-fiction writers
Ohio State University School of Communication alumni
Paulsboro High School alumni
People from Paulsboro, New Jersey
20th-century American male writers
Historians from New Jersey
Military personnel from New Jersey